The Class 93 is a type of electric multiple unit used by Keretapi Tanah Melayu for its intercity Electric Train Service (ETS). A total of 10 sets in 6-car formations have been built and delivered by CRRC Zhuzhou (initially CSR Zhuzhou) of China, with 9 additional sets ordered in 2019 with delivery finished in 2020 (these 9 sets has been branded as ETS2 or 93/2). In light of the Gemas-JB EDTP Modification, another 10 sets (branded as 93/3 or ETS3) has been ordered and will commence delivery later this year. As per the technology exchange agreement, part of the consignment will be partially assembled in Batu Gajah, Malaysia.

The Class 93 ETS is utilised in the electrified section of the West Coast Line, from Gemas to Padang Besar. It has cut journey times significantly, covering Padang Besar from Kuala Lumpur within four hours and fifteen minutes, with 5 stops at hand, while the Kuala Lumpur-Penang leg can be covered within 3 hours.

Another 9 were ordered in 2019 and delivery finished in 2020. They are branded as ETS 2, and offer a business class coach as well as a redesigned standard class accommodation.

In March 2020, another 11 sets were ordered to increase capacity following the completion of the Gemas-JB EDTP modification in October 2022. These 11 sets will be branded as ETS 3 and the interior of these trains has not been revealed by KTMB.

Design
The KTM Class 93 is a custom built train engineered to high speed metre gauge operation. Dubbed the "Malaysian Bullet Train", or "Pocket Rocket", it features a streamline sloped head, with better aerodynamic efficiency relative to previous KTM rail classes. It is expected to be one of the fastest trains operating on metre gauge track. Relative to KTM standard meter gauge bogies, special higher strength materials were used in bogie construction. This is done in order to damp and sustain the higher stresses incurred by going at high speed over narrow gauge.

The train uses a standard light weight aluminum body. The speed and width are limited by the narrow, higher speed and wider trains requiring the use of at minimum standard gauge tracks, currently only used in Malaysia by the Rapid KL lines and the Express Rail Link, although the proposed Kuala Lumpur–Singapore high-speed rail would use standard gauge. The rail class also features standard safety systems such as a hotbox alarm system installation, horizontal stabilizer, vehicle health monitoring systems and other advanced safety equipment. Unlike the earlier KTM Class 91, the KTM Class 93 reportedly sources all its components from China, with the exception of the on-board equipment (such as is the ATP) which is sourced from the Chinese subsidiary of Bombardier.

The mechanical and exterior design of the original Class 93/1 and the newer Class 93/2 are almost identical, the only difference being the exterior livery.

On-board service

Class 93/1 

Standard Class: The seats are arranged in a 2+2 fashion, and have blue seat covers and red headrests. The seats have amenities such as a power outlet and a tray table, typical of long distance trains. In addition to this, it also features standard intercity offerings such as luggage racks, a toilet and prayer area within the length of an individual 6-car set. It has gang-ways interconnecting each coach, allowing passengers unrestricted movement throughout the entire length of the train.  Since these trains will operate in a tropical climate, they have over-head air-conditioning systems, providing temperature control, ventilation and dehumidification to maximise passenger comfort. The trains are also equipped with LTE-enabled WiFi throughout but currently it has not been turned on yet.

Class 93/2 

Standard Class: The facilities are very similar to those offered on the first batch, with a few improvements. In addition to the transverse seating layout, there are cluster seats which face each other. Such seats have a table between them. The seats have grey seat covers and red headrests. Toilets have changing tables for infants. 

Business Class:  The Business class accommodation and service marks a step up from the standard class. In addition to the facilities already enjoyed in standard class, there are additional features otherwise not seen on the standard class. The seats are arranged in a 2+1 configuration and are wider and able to recline up to 45 degrees. The seats can be rotated to face any direction. In addition to a power outlet, a USB port is provided. Each seat has its own on demand video screen for in-train entertainment. Wi-Fi is complimentary for business class passengers. Each coach has its own steward or stewardess, which the passenger can summon from his seat. On-board dining is included in the fare. Passengers are given their own amenity kit.

Testing and Commissioning
Before launch, all new train sets must undergo and pass compulsory testing, in this they are required to go  without logging a single fault. The train set will undergo testing for its automatic train protection system (ATP), other components tested included the propulsion system, the brakes, air-conditioning, door operations, auxiliary power supply, suspension, train control and management system, couplers, and even the wipers.

Delays to the July launch were attributed to ATP warnings whenever ETS201 enters the Butterworth branch line. Thus regulatory approval was delayed until October. The first 4 sets went into service on 10 October 2015, operating between Padang Besar and Gemas on the ETS Ekspres service. As of 2016, all 10 sets from the first batch are in service.

Procurement
The purchase of KTM class 93 was made under a bilateral trade agreement between the Malaysian Ministry of Transport and the Chinese Transport Ministry with the contract signed in September 2013. On top of this, the agreement includes a 2-year maintenance agreement. It also includes various aspects including financing, construction of transportation facilities and other turnkey contracts as well as the transfer of advanced technology and management methods.

The procurement of the Class 93 includes a clause that future sets of the series would be assembled in Malaysia. A CRRC facility for maintaining and assembling was commissioned in Batu Gajah, Malaysia to assist on this end. In April 2017 a further nine set of ETS trains were ordered. Each train set costs RM50 million.

Launch date
The first of the 6-car Class 93 EMUs entered service on 3 September 2015. ETS 201 began service by operating the 5AM service from Ipoh to Kuala Lumpur Sentral (EG9301). The ETS then operated the 9.30AM KL Sentral to Padang Besar service (EG9208).

The second batch of 9 train sets, Class 93/2, entered service on 11 October 2019.

A third batch of 10 train sets, Class 93/3, is currently being tendered in March 2020. This order is meant for the support in increasing capacity following ETDP extension from Gemas to Johor Bahru in 2023.

Formation
Each train set is formed as follows, with cars numbered alphabetically (A to F) instead of numerically, and with Car 1 (A) facing south (KL Sentral, Gemas) and Car 6 (F) facing north (Padang Besar, Butterworth).

Cars 2 and 5 are equipped with a double-arm Z-shaped pantograph.

Gallery

References

KTM ETS
Multiple units of Malaysia
CRRC multiple units
25 kV AC multiple units